Simone Avondetto (born 15 April 2000) is an Italian cross-country mountain biker. He won the under-23 cross-country race at the 2022 UCI Mountain Bike World Championships.

Major results
2018
 1st  Cross-country, National Junior Championships
2021
 2nd Overall UCI Under-23 XCO World Cup
1st Les Gets
2nd Snowshoe
2022
 UCI World Championships
1st  Under-23 cross-country
2nd  Team relay
 1st  Cross-country, European Under-23 Championships
 UCI Under-23 XCO World Cup
2nd Nové Město
2nd Leogang

References

References
 

2000 births
Living people
Italian male cyclists
People from Moncalieri
Cross-country mountain bikers
21st-century Italian people
Cyclists at the 2018 Summer Youth Olympics